This is a list of Filipino painters.

(A-Z)

Abad, Pacita (1946–2004)
Abellana, Martino (1914–1986)
Arellano, Juan
Alcuaz, Federico Aguilar (1932–2011)
Amorsolo, Fernando (1892–1972)
Amorsolo, Pablo (1898–1945)
Ancheta, Isidro (1882–1946)
Antonio, Angelito (born 1939)
Antonio, Marcel (born 1965)
Aute, Luis Eduardo (born 1943)
Belleza, Norma (born 1939)
Borlongan, Elmer (born 1967)
Cabrera, Benedicto (born 1942)
De la Rosa, Fabián (1869–1937)
Edades, Victorio C. (1895–1985)
Francisco, Botong (1912–1969)
Gorospe, Paco (1939–2002)
Hidalgo, Felix Resurrección (1855–1913)
Jaylo, Jon (born 1975)
Joya, Jose T. (1931–1995)
Kiukok, Ang (1931–2005)
Legaspi, Cesar (1917–1994)
Leynes, Nestor (1922–2016)
Luna, Juan (1857–1899)
Luz, Arturo R. (born 1926)
Miranda, Nemesio "Nemi" (born 1949)
Manansala, Vicente (1910–1981)
Mapa, Jao (born 1976)
Miclat, Maningning (1972–2000)
Ocampo, Hernando R. (1911–1978)
Olmedo, Onib (1937–1996)
Ossorio, Alfonso A. (1916–1990)
Parial, Mario (1944–2013)
Phoenix, Satine (born 1980)
Saguil, Nena (1924–1994)
Sillada, Danny (born 1963)
Tabuena, Romeo Villalva (1921–2015)
Tapaya, Rodel (born 1980)
Zóbel de Ayala y Montojo, Fernando (1924–1984)

Filipino
Filipino painters